Uganda competed at the 2016 Summer Olympics in Rio de Janeiro, Brazil, from 5 to 21 August 2016. Since the nation's official debut in 1956, Ugandan athletes have appeared in every edition of the Summer Olympic Games, with the exception of the 1976 Summer Olympics in Montreal because of its partial support of the African boycott.

The Uganda Olympic Committee fielded a team of 21 athletes, 14 men and 7 women, to compete only in athletics, boxing, and swimming at the games. It was the nation's largest delegation sent to the Olympics since 1988, eclipsing the record of 15 athletes who attended the London games four years earlier. About 80 percent of Uganda's full roster competed in athletics, particularly those who specialized in long-distance running and the marathon.

The Ugandan roster featured six returning Olympians, although only four of them competed in London in 2012: defending marathon champion Stephen Kiprotich, swimmer Jamila Lunkuse, and the steeplechase tandem of Jacob Araptany and Benjamin Kiplagat, who headed to his third games as the most experienced member. Meanwhile, Sweden-based boxers Ronald Serugo (men's flyweight) and Kennedy Katende (men's light heavyweight) staged their Olympic comeback in Rio de Janeiro after eight years of absence.

Other notable athletes on the Ugandan team were Solomon Mutai who won a bronze medal in the men's marathon at the 2015 World Championships in Beijing; 15-year-old distance runner Jacob Kiplimo (men's 5000 metres); and US-based freestyle swimmer Joshua Tibatemwa, who was the nation's flag bearer in the opening ceremony.

Uganda, however, left Rio de Janeiro without a medal, in contrast to the previous Games. Distance runner Joshua Kiprui Cheptegei produced the most successful outcome for Uganda, finishing eighth in the men's 5,000 metres and sixth with a personal best in the men's 10,000 metres. The nation's most celebrated athlete, Kiprotich, failed to retain his marathon title, slipping to a fourteenth-place finish in Rio de Janeiro.

Athletics

Ugandan athletes achieved qualifying standards in the following athletics events (up to a maximum of 3 athletes in each event):

A total of 17 athletes (11 men and 6 women), highlighted by defending Olympic marathon champion Kiprotich, were named as part of Uganda's official team announcement for the Games on 15 July 2016.

Track & road events
Men

Women

Boxing

Uganda entered two boxers to compete in each of the following weight classes in the Olympic boxing tournament. 2008 Olympians Ronald Serugo and Kennedy Katende, who previously competed for Sweden, had claimed Olympic spots as a result of their box-off triumphs at the 2016 African Qualification Tournament in Yaoundé, Cameroon.

Swimming

Uganda received a Universality invitation from FINA to send two swimmers (one male and one female) to the Olympics.

References

External links 
 

Nations at the 2016 Summer Olympics
2016
Olympics